Special Generation was an American new jack swing and urban contemporary R&B quintet. The group members were Maquet Robinson, Kendrick Washington, Fernando Carter, Charles Salter and Maurice Dowdell. The group sings background vocals on several of MC Hammer's songs, including "U Can't Touch This", "Help the Children" and "Have You Seen Her".

SpecialGeneration is a grammy award winning american group, most popular during the 1990s, who’s known for their New Jack Swing, R&B Soul with smooth acapella harmonies.

Founded in Saint Petersburg, Florida and active since 1990, the group grew up listening to the Stylistics, Harold Melvin and the Blue Notes, The Temptations and New Edition.
Signed to Bust it / Capitol Records during the 90’s Special Generation garnered a #8 song in the country that rode the Music Billboard Top R&B singles chart for 21 weeks called ”Love Me Just For Me,” along with their other songs "Spark of Love,” "You Are Everything" and “Lift your Head and Smile” which peaked at #13. The group initially consisted of singers Kendrick "kdubb " Washington, Charles "OG" Salter, Fernando "Chip" Carter, Maquet "Quet" Robinson and Maurice "Mo Money" Dowdell.
The group was pioneered under the wings of Capitol Records and went on to make a name for themselves by signing a management deal and working with the chart breaking Hip Hop rapper called MC Hammer and receiving five Multi-Platinum R.I.A.A Awards for recording background vocals on songs like “U Can’t Touch This,” “Tell Me Have you seen her,” “Pray” and “Help the Children” and “On Your face.”

Their debut 1990 Album was entitled “Take It To The Floor’ written and produced by Stanley “MC Hammer” Burrell, Felton Pilate, James “Jae -E” Early, followed up with a sophomore 1992 Album release called “Butterflies” written and produced by Gerald Levert, Steven Russell Harts from Troop and Joe Little from the Rude Boys, Greg Cauthen, Derrick Hall.

During, 2010 the Group signed a Single deal with Upstairs Records releasing a song called” I Don’t Wanna Be Alone.” Since then Special Generation has toured with acts like Bobby Brown, TLC, Johnny Gill, SWV, After 7, Tony Toni Tone, Mary J Blige, Keith Sweat, Silk and the Rude Boys. Appeared on Shows like Oprah Winfrey Show, Arsenio Hall Show, MTV Jams, VHI and BET Video Soul.

Now in 2019 going by the abbreviated name “SG” the members have released a new called “I Can’t Help Myself” which is about falling in love again, the answer to their debut hit song” Love Me Just for Me.” Special Generation is among the music industry's first of the 90’s male pop era singing groups like: New Edition, Troop, New Kid’s on The Block, therefore Special Generation has always received respect from other musicians as being a trendsetter in the music industry.

Special Generation will continue to perform worldwide, and their most recent studio album, releasing under GIG Music Group / Akachi Digital called “Forever SG” will hit the stores soon early 2020.

in 2020 SG Releases their newest Single entitled "I Can't Help Myself" Please be sure to stream and download their latest hit single.

References

American rhythm and blues musical groups
New jack swing music groups